John Nayagam is most well known for his part in ITV's Emmerdale as vet Hari Prasad. He has also made an appearance in Doctors. He has played Dorian Roberts on Holby City.

References

External links
Digital Spy Interview with John Nayagam

Year of birth missing (living people)
Living people
Irish people of Indian descent
People from County Offaly
Place of birth missing (living people)